Pesa Gama is a family of diesel and electric locomotives built from 2012 by Pesa SA company.

History

Origin
In 2001, Pesa had announced that they would change their main focus from repairing locomotives to building their own locomotives. Initially, only two units have been built – the first was a mixed-traffic electric locomotive with an additional diesel engine, the second was a pure diesel. Since then a variety of diesel and electric powered locomotives have been built. There are currently 16 locomotives in service, in 3 different versions.

The Gama Marathon
The first model of the family was the 111Ed Marathon locomotive. Its construction began in early 2012, and premiered on September 18 at the InnoTrans Trade Fair 2012 in Berlin. The first test drive took place in October 2012 in Bydgoszcz Wschód Station, and later on the railway lines to Inowrocław, Poznań and Zduńska Wola Karsznice. The behavior of the locomotive was tested working goods trains with different loads until 25 November 2012. From 27 November 2012 to 3 December 2012 the locomotive had been tested on the test track in Żmigród, reaching top speed of 173 km/h, After this, the locomotive was issued with temporary certification to work passenger trains on Polish railway network at speeds up to 160 km/h, and goods trains at speeds up to 140 km/h. In order to become permanently certified for operation, the locomotive had to be tested by railway operators. On 11 January 2013 the locomotive began test service with Lotos Kolej, and later also with PKP Intercity, Pol-Miedz Trans and Orlen KolTrans. After the test service was successfully concluded, the RTO has issued the final, permanent certificate for the 111Ed (with variants 111E, 111Eb, 111Ec) locomotive on 10 July 2014.

Diesel-powered Gama
In July 2014, the company built the first diesel-powered Gama. The locomotive specification is compatible with the specifications of locomotives, and PKP Intercity had ordered therefore 10 units. The locomotive was presented in September at InnoTrans. In mid-October the locomotive began to be tested in the second half of the month, by IPS Tabor, tests have been performed on the  Rokietnica – Szamotuły railway line.

Full dual-mode Gama

As of 2021, Pesa, together with IPS Tabor, works on a bi-mode Gama (111DE) with a more powerful diesel engine that would enable it to be used as a mainline locomotive on both electrified and unelectrified railway lines.

PKP Intercity
Polish long distance passenger transport company PKP Intercity has taken delivery of 10 diesel locomotives (111Db), They have been classified as SU160.

References

Electric locomotives of Poland
PESA SA
Bo′Bo′ electric locomotives of Europe